Rasmus Overrein (1815—1895) was a Norwegian builder and architect who built a number of churches in the Nord-Trøndelag area in Norway.

Overrein was largely a self-taught builder. Starting around 1840, he began constructing buildings in the area of what is now Steinkjer Municipality in Trøndelag county. In 1856, he used the designs of Christian Heinrich Grosch to build the Namdalseid Church. That church served as a model of many other churches that Overrein would go on the build in the future. Most of his other churches were a simplified design version of the Namdalseid Church: and simple long church with some sparse Neo-Gothic details.

Works
He built or renovated the following churches:
Egge Church
Henning Church
Kolvereid Church
Følling Church
Malm Church
Salberg Church
Kvam Church
For Church (tower)
Gimsøy Church

References

1815 births
1895 deaths
19th-century Norwegian architects
Norwegian ecclesiastical architects